El Fehoul is a town and commune in Tlemcen Province in northwestern Algeria. At the 2008 census it had a population of 7,045.

El Fehoul is located in the daïra of Remchi and the wilaya of Tlemcen.

Its geographical co-ordinates are 35° 7' 0" North, 1° 17' 40" West.

References

Communes of Tlemcen Province